The Lake Traverse Indian Reservation is the homeland of the federally recognized Sisseton Wahpeton Oyate, a branch of the Santee Dakota group of Native Americans. Most of the reservation covers parts of five counties in northeastern South Dakota, while smaller parts are in two counties in southeastern North Dakota, United States.  The Reservation was created by treaty on April 22 1867 and called the Flatiron Reservation in reference to its triangular shape.  It was created for the "friendly Dakota" from the Minnesota hostilities of 1862-1866.  Signatories of the treaty were Gabriel Renville, John Otherday plus twenty-one other Sisseton and Wahpeton leaders.  Gabriel Renville was the first Chief of the Reservation. 

Its resident population of 10,408 persons was counted during the 2000 census. About one-third of its inhabitants identify as of solely Native American heritage. Its largest community is the city of Sisseton, South Dakota. It operates a tribal college, Sisseton-Wahpeton Community College.

Geography
Over 60 percent of its land area lies in Roberts County, South Dakota, but there are lesser amounts in Marshall, Day, Grant, and Codington counties in South Dakota, as well as Sargent and Richland counties in North Dakota.

Tribal information

 Reservation: Former Lake Traverse; parts of Marshall, Day, Codington, Grant and Roberts counties
 Division: Santee
 Bands: Sisseton (Sinsin Tunwan: "Swamp Village"), Wahpeton (Wahpetowan: "Leaf Village")
 Land area: 106,153 acres (without boundaries)
 Tribal headquarters: Agency Village, SD
 Time zone: Central
 Traditional language: Dakota
 Enrolled members living within former reservation area: 9,894
 Major employers: Dakota Magic Casino, Dakota Sioux Casino, Dakota Western, Dakota Crossing Grocery, Dakota Connection Casino, tribal government, Bureau of Indian Affairs

Tribal government
 Charter: None; Constitution and Bylaws: Yes -IRA
 Date Approved: October 16, 1946
 Name of Governing Body: Sisseton-Wahpeton Sioux Tribal Council
 Number of council members: (7) seven council members
 Dates of Constitutional amendments: November 21, 1978, June 9, 1980
 Number of Executive Officers: (3) Tribal Chairman, Vice Chairman, and Tribal Secretary

Tribal elections
 Primary election is held in October and the general election in November. Members of council shall serve terms of four years. Any council and executive committee member shall serve no more than two consecutive terms for a total of eight years in the same office. Any council member or executive committee member may again file for office after a two-year time period.
 Number of election districts or communities: 10

Tribal Council meetings
 The council shall meet regularly on the first Tuesday, Wednesday and third Thursday of each month or upon call of the chairman of the council.
 Quorum number: General Council members is ten percent of eligible members

Education and media
 Tribal College: Sisseton-Wahpeton Community College, Agency Village
 Weekly newspaper: Sota Iya Ye Yapi (smoke signals)

Notable people
 Paul War Cloud, (1930–1973), Sisseton-Wahpeton, was born in 1930 near Sica Hollow. A self-taught artist, War Cloud depicted Dakota culture and tradition in his paintings. Many of his works are on display at the Tekakwitha Fine Arts Center in Sisseton. A War Cloud mural, Unity Through the Great Spirit, hangs at the Cultural Heritage Center in Pierre, South Dakota. 
 Gabriel Renville (1824–1892) was the last chief of the Sissetowan and Wahpetowan (non-hereditary).  Born in Chief Sweet Corn's village on Lake Traverse, he was born into the Rainville/Renville clan, a Métis family of French and Dakota ancestry who had operated a trading post in Minnesota.  His appointment by the federal government as chief in 1866 was seconded by the Sisseton-Wahpeton in 1867.

Communities
Agency Village, South Dakota
Claire City, South Dakota
Goodwill, South Dakota
Lake City, South Dakota (most, population 46)
Long Hollow, South Dakota
New Effington, South Dakota
Ortley, South Dakota
Peever, South Dakota
Rosholt, South Dakota
Sisseton, South Dakota
Summit, South Dakota
Veblen, South Dakota
Waubay, South Dakota (part, population 15)

References

Lake Traverse Reservation, South Dakota/North Dakota United States Census Bureau

Geography of Codington County, South Dakota
Geography of Day County, South Dakota
Geography of Grant County, South Dakota
Geography of Marshall County, South Dakota
Geography of Richland County, North Dakota
Geography of Roberts County, South Dakota
Geography of Sargent County, North Dakota
Sisseton Wahpeton Oyate
American Indian reservations in South Dakota
American Indian reservations in North Dakota
1946 establishments in North Dakota
1946 establishments in South Dakota